Aloposaurus is an extinct genus of gorgonopsian therapsids from the Late Permian of South Africa. It was first named by Robert Broom in 1910, and contains the type species A. gracilis, and possibly a second species A. tenuis.

Classification

Below is a cladogram from the phylogenetic analysis of Gebauer (2007):

References

Sources 
 paleodb.org

Gorgonopsia
Prehistoric therapsid genera
Lopingian synapsids of Africa
Fossil taxa described in 1910
Taxa named by Robert Broom
Lopingian genus first appearances
Lopingian genus extinctions